Black gum may refer to several species of plants:

 Nyssa sylvatica, a tree native to eastern North America
 Eucalyptus aggregata, a tree that grows in south eastern Australia
 Eucalyptus ovata, a tree that grows in south eastern Australia